Nic Berry (born 13 March 1984 in Brisbane) is an Australian rugby union referee. He took up refereeing after retiring from playing in 2012 due to a series of concussions. After taking up the whistle, he has become one of the few former Super Rugby players to also have refereed a match in Super Rugby.

Playing career
Berry was educated at Ipswich Grammar School in Queensland. He represented Australia at rugby union in the under-21 national team at the under-21 World Cup in Argentina. He made his Super 12 debut for the Queensland Reds against the Hurricanes in 2005. He started four games in 2005, and played another five off the bench. He made his run-on debut at halfback replacing the injured Josh Valentine in a match against the Bulls. In 2006 Berry was selected in the Australian Prime Ministers XV to take on the Japanese national team in Tokyo on 4 November. He was also part of the Sunnybank team that won the 2005 and 2007 Queensland Premier Rugby trophy.

In July 2007, it was rumoured that Berry was looking at offers from overseas and requesting a release from S14 and ARC commitments. He then left the Queensland Reds and moved to Racing Métro 92 Paris where he played for the following three seasons. At the beginning of the 2010–11 season Berry joined London Wasps on a 2-year contract. After a number of strong performances he signed a contract extension for the following two seasons. Berry retired early into the 2012–13 season at the advice of his physician after sustaining a series of concussions.

Refereeing career
Berry made a rapid rise up the refereeing ranks in 2015, making his debut both in Queensland Premier Rugby and in Australia's National Rugby Championship within a year of taking up the whistle.

He joined the Super Rugby referees panel for the 2016 season, and refereed his first match in Super Rugby on 9 April 2016, between the Stormers and Sunwolves.

He was selected as one of the referees at the 2019 Rugby World Cup.

References

External links

1984 births
Australian rugby union players
Australian rugby union referees
Australian schoolteachers
Living people
Racing 92 players
Wasps RFC players
Sportspeople from Ipswich, Queensland
Super Rugby referees
ARU referees
Rugby World Cup referees
Rugby union players from Queensland
Rugby union halfbacks